KDCC (1550 AM) is a radio station licensed to Dodge City, Kansas, United States, the station serves the SW Kansas area.  The station is currently owned by Dodge City Community College.

History
KEDD went on air in 1961. It was owned by Alf Landon and the Seward County Broadcasting Company and broadcast until April 30, 1987. The station was placed in several trusts after Alf Landon's death in 1990 until the trustees sold the station to Dodge City Community College in 1992. KEDD relaunched as KDCC and became sister to the existing FM radio station owned by the college, KONQ 91.9 FM.

References

External links

DCC
Radio stations established in 1990
CBS Sports Radio stations
1990 establishments in Kansas